Filip Derkoski (born 29 December 2000) is a Macedonian swimmer. He competed in the 2020 Summer Olympics.

References

2000 births
Living people
Swimmers at the 2020 Summer Olympics
Macedonian male swimmers
Olympic swimmers of North Macedonia